New Room may refer  to:

New Room, song by American rock band Chavez (band)
New Room, Bristol, the first Methodist chapel, built by John Wesley
The New Room, 1989 novel by Canadian philosopher Jan Zwicky